Rose Marie Heck (born August 4, 1932) is an American politician who served as the mayor of Hasbrouck Heights, New Jersey, from 1988 to 1995 and again from 2008 to 2015.

Career 
Heck has served on the South West Community Development Committee since 1970 and was its chair from 1983 to 1990. She was the mayor of Hasbrouck Heights from 1988 to 1995, and served on the borough's Planning Board during that period. Heck served on the Hasbrouck Heights Council from 1985 to 1987 and on the Hasbrouck Heights Zoning Board from 1978 to 1984. She was a Commissioner on the Bergen County Utility Authority Commissioner from 1989 to 1991 and was chair of the County Community Development Committee from 1987 to 1990. On November 6, 2007, Heck was elected for her third term as Mayor of Hasbrouck Heights.

Heck served as a member of the New Jersey General Assembly for the 38th legislative district from 1991 to 2003. Heck's district covered an area between the Passaic and Hudson Rivers in suburban Bergen County. In the 2003 general election, Heck lost to Joseph Coniglio, the Democratic Party candidate for the office of State Senate for District 38.

Heck had been elected in 1991 to fill the assembly seat vacated by Pat Schuber stepped down to serve as county executive of Bergen County.

In the Assembly, Heck served as majority conference leader from 2000 to 2001 and chair of the Policy and Regulatory Oversight Committee from 1996 to 1999.

References

External links
, New Jersey Legislature

1932 births
Living people
Women mayors of places in New Jersey
Mayors of places in New Jersey
New Jersey city council members
People from Hasbrouck Heights, New Jersey
Politicians from Bergen County, New Jersey
Women state legislators in New Jersey
Republican Party members of the New Jersey General Assembly
Women city councillors in New Jersey
21st-century American women